Yelbiz Castle (literally "Spider Castle") is a castle ruin in Mersin Province, Turkey.

It is situated on a  hill to the north east of Bozyazı. Visitors follow the road from Tekedüzü village to west in the dense forestry. There is no road in the last  of the course.

Within the castle, which is mostly in ruins, there is a monastery with two wide halls, a part of a basilica and a courtyard. There are remains of mosaics with geometric design in the monastery. The windows are round arch type. There are two cisterns and two towers of about  height in the west of the castle.

References

History of Mersin Province
Bozyazı District
Ruined castles in Turkey
Byzantine fortifications in Turkey